Zarqanak (also Romanized as Zarqānak; also known as Zarjānak) is a village in Ramjerd-e Yek Rural District, in the Central District of Marvdasht County, Fars Province, Iran. At the 2006 census, its population was 733, in 168 families.

References 

Populated places in Marvdasht County